The Limidae or file shells are members of the only family of bivalve molluscs in the order Limida. The family includes 130 living species, assigned to 10 genera. Widely distributed in all seas from shallow to deep waters, the species are usually epifaunal or nestling, with many species building byssal nests for protection. The majority of species are capable of irregular swimming by waving their long mantle tentacles.

Genera
 Acesta H. and A. Adams, 1858
 †Antiquilima Cox, 1943
 Ctenoides Mörch, 1853
 †Ctenostreon Eichwald, 1862
 †Dimorphoconcha Wasmer & Hautmann, 2012
 Divarilima Powell, 1958
 Escalima Iredale, 1929     
 Lima Bruguière, 1789    
 Limaria Link, 1807    
 Limatula S. V. Wood, 1839
 Limea Bronn, 1831
 Mantellina Sacco, 1904
 †Plagiostoma J. Sowerby, 1814
 †Pseudolimea Arkell, 1933

References

 
 

 
Bivalve families
Taxa named by Constantine Samuel Rafinesque